The Haymarket Theatre (1796-1803) or Hay-Market Theatre was a theatre in late-18th century Boston, Massachusetts. Organized by Charles Stuart Powell, it occupied a large, wooden building "opposite the Mall on Common (later Tremont) Street, near Hatch's Tavern." In addition to dramatic plays, the theatre presented some 62 musical entertainments during its first 5 years. The Haymarket "was seldom used after 1800, and on March 3, 1803, it was offered for sale at auction on the condition that it be removed in 60 days."

Works performed

 Isaac Bickerstaffe's "The Padlock"
 Samuel Birch's "The Adopted Child"
 William Hill Brown's "West Point Preserved"
 John Daly Burk's "Bunker-Hill; or, the Death of General Warren"
 Susanna Centlivre's "The Ghost"
 James Cobb's "The Siege of Belgrade"
 George Colman's "Inkle and Yarico"
 Richard Cumberland's "Note of Hand"
 Charles Dibdin's "The Quaker"; "The Waterman"
 David Everett's "Daranzel; or, the Persian Patriot"
 George Farquhar's "The Recruiting Officer"
 Henry Fielding's "The Mock Doctor"
 David Garrick's "The Lying Valet"
 Oliver Goldsmith's "She Stoops to Conquer"
 John Hodgkinson's "The Launch, or, Huzza for the Constitution"
 Elizabeth Inchbald's "Married Man"; "Animal Magnetism;" "Child of Nature"
 Robert Jephson's "Two Strings to Your Bow"
 Hugh Kelly's "Romance of an Hour"
 Kotzebue's "The stranger; or, Misanthropy and repentance"
 Nathaniel Lee's "Alexander the Great"
 Thomas Morton's "Way to Get Married"
 Arthur Murphy's "Old Maid"
 John O'Keeffe's "The Young Quaker"; "Agreeable Surprise;" "Son in Law"
 Walley Chamberlain Oulton's "All in Good Humour"
 William Preston's "Death of Louis XVI"
 Frederick Reynolds' "Cheap Living"
 Richard Brinsley Sheridan's "The School for Scandal"
 Royall Tyler's "A Georgia Spec; or, Land in the Moon"
 "The Boston Balloon; or, a Supposed Flight from the Beacon-Hill" ("localized from the celebrated farce written by Mrs. Inchbald, of Mogul Tale")
 "Village Lawyer"
 "Washington, or Memorable Era of 1776"

Performers

 Mrs. Allen
 Mr. Amean
 Mr. Barrett
 Mrs. Barrett
 Mr. Borier
 Mr. Bowen
 Mrs. Brett
 Miss Broadhurst
 Mr. Clough
 Mr. Cunnington
 Mr. Dickenson
 Mr. Dubois
 Mr. Fawcett
 Mons. Francisqui (or Francisquy)
 Mrs. Harper
 Miss Harrison
 Mr. Hodgkinson
 Mrs. Hodgkinson
 Mr. Hughes
 Mrs. Hughes
 Miss Gowen
 Mr. Kenny 
 Mrs. King
 Mr. Lege
 Madame Lege
 Mr. Marriott
 Mrs. Pick
 Mr. S. Powell
 Mrs. S. Powell
 Mr. Sevens
 Master Shaffer
 Mr. Simpson
 Mrs. Simpson
 Mr. Smith
 Mr. Spinacuta
 Mr. Sprague
 Mr. Taylor
 Mr. Turnbull
 Mr. Val
 Madame Val
 Mr. Villiers
 Eleanor Westray (later Mrs. Darley)
 Elizabeth Westray (later Mrs. Villiers and Mrs. Twaits)
 David Williamson 
 Mr. Wilson

References

Further reading
 Letter to the editor. Polar Star and Boston Daily Advertiser; 12-30-1796
 William Warland Clapp. A Record of the Boston Stage. Boston: J. Munroe & Co., 1853

External links

 Harvard Theatre Collection, Houghton Library, Harvard College Library. Early American playbills: Guide; includes playbills from the Hay-Market Theatre

Former theatres in Boston
Theatres completed in 1796
Former buildings and structures in Boston
1796 establishments in Massachusetts
1803 disestablishments in Massachusetts
18th century in Boston
Boston Theater District